Patricia Anne Musick  is an American voice actress, who has provided numerous voices in many television shows, films and video games. She and her husband, Jeff Whitman, a personal manager and set construction coordinator, are the parents of actress and singer Mae Whitman.

Career
Musick’s first role was in the 1981 film The Loch Ness Horror. She played a number of cartoon characters, such as Snappy Smurfling in The Smurfs and Harold Frumpkin in Rugrats.

As Tony Toponi
While casting for Don Bluth’s film An American Tail, Musick was one of the women chosen to play Tony Toponi, becoming one of her well-known works. She based his voice on a friend she knew from grade school. In the early 1990s, Musick was unable to recast as Tony following her then-current responsibility of her daughter Mae Whitman, who was just born in 1988, causing the use of her character to be limited in the first sequel and completely unused in Fievel's American Tails until the direct-to-video sequels in the late 1990s.

Personal life
Musick married personal manager and set construction coordinator named Jeff Whitman in 1983. She gave birth to Mae Whitman in 1988.

Filmography

Television
 A.T.O.M. – Momma Rossi
 All Grown Up! – Harold Frumpkin, Harold's Sister, Edith
 Avatar: The Last Airbender – Haru's Mom
 Batman: Brave and the Bold – Martha Wayne
 Batman: The Animated Series - Stella
 Curious George – Ms. Klopotznick, Mrs. Dewey, Old Woman, Little Girl
 Darkwing Duck – Female Kid
 Disney's Adventures of the Gummi Bears – Ursa Gummi
 Disney's House of Mouse – Fiddler Pig
 Duckman – Fluffy & Uranus (later Charles)
 DuckTales – Bully Beagle, Umpire
 Extreme Ghostbusters – Janine Melnitz
 Foofur - Additional voices
 Johnny Bravo – Additional voices, Older Little Suzy
 New Kids on the Block – Additional voices
 New Looney Tunes - Airport announcer
 OK K.O.! Let's Be Heroes - Elsa Frankenteen
 The Buzz on Maggie – Dawn's lackeys, Ugly Bug
 Saber Rider and the Star Sheriffs – April Eagle
 SpaceCats – Dementia DeFortino
 Superman: The Animated Series – Mother, Guardian #2
 Sylvester and Tweety Mysteries – Marry Ann
 The Further Adventures of Superted – Prince Rajeesh
 Rugrats – Harold Frumpkin
 The Smurfs – Snappy Smurfling 
 Teenage Mutant Ninja Turtles – Mona Lisa
 The Twisted Tales of Felix the Cat – Additional voices
 The Life and Times of Juniper Lee – Eloise
 The Tick – Meriem Brunch: The Mad Nanny, The Bee Twins, Tuun-La: Not of this Earth
 ThunderCats (2011 TV series) – Albo
 TUGS – Lillie Lightship (US test dub only)
 Wake, Rattle, and Roll – Angel, Elsa
 Where's Waldo – Additional voices

Films
 It's the Pied Piper, Charlie Brown (TV Special) – First Woman (voice)
 An American Tail – Tony
 An American Tail: The Treasure of Manhattan Island – Tony
 An American Tail: The Mystery of the Night Monster – Tony
 The Loch Ness Horror - Ms. Stowall
 Mr. Peabody & Sherman – History Teacher
 Rockin' with Judy Jetson – Fanclub Member, Starr, Zowie
 Scooby-Doo and the Ghoul School – Elsa Frankenteen
 Scooby-Doo and the Reluctant Werewolf – Vanna Pire
 The Pebble and the Penguin – Pola; Chinstrap Penguin #1
 Thumbelina – Mrs. Rabbit

Video games
 Dinosaur Adventure 3D - Rolf
 Duckman – Additional voices
 DuckTales: Remastered – Computer Voice
 Mortimer and the Riddles of the Medallion – Giraffe, Flying Squirrel, Timberland Gate
 Full Throttle – Miranda Rose Wood

References

External links
 

Living people
American voice actresses
American film actresses
American television actresses
American video game actresses
Actresses from St. Louis
Actresses from Los Angeles
20th-century American actresses
21st-century American actresses
Year of birth missing (living people)